The Center for Countering Disinformation (CCD) is a working body of the National Security and Defense Council of Ukraine established in accordance with the decision of the National Security and Defense Council of Ukraine dated March 11, 2021 "On the creation of the Center for Countering Disinformation", enacted by Presidential Decree No. 106 of March 19, 2021.

The Center ensures the implementation of measures to counteract current and projected threats to Ukraine's national security and national interests in the information sphere, ensuring Ukraine's information security, identifying and counteracting disinformation, effectively countering propaganda, destructive information influences and campaigns, and preventing attempts to manipulate public opinion.

History 
Established on March 11, 2021, it is a body of the National Security and Defense Council of Ukraine.

On April 2, Polina Lysenko was appointed head of the center by President Vladimir Zelensky's decree. She previously held the position of assistant to the first deputy director of the National Anti-Corruption Bureau of Ukraine in 2015–2019, and worked in the Ukrainian Prosecutor General's Office in 2019–2020.

The center started functioning on April 6, 2021.

On May 7, 2021, by his Decree No. 187/2021, the President approved the Regulation which stipulates that the center is subordinated to the National Security and Defense Council of Ukraine, the general direction and coordination of its activity is performed by the Secretary of the NSDC; the number of CCD employees is 52 people. The regulation also defines the concept, aims, functions, and basic rights and responsibilities of the center.

On August 19, 2021, the head of the Center Polina Lysenko took maternity leave, and the duties of the head of the center were entrusted to her first deputy Andriy Shapovalov.

Aim  
The Center for Countering Disinformation activities encompass such areas as defense, fight against crime and corruption, foreign and domestic policy, economy, infrastructure, environment, healthcare, social sphere, and science and technology direction. But the main focus is on countering the spread of misinformation on the Internet and fakes in the media. The Center does not have punitive functions for misinformation and will not be able to apply sanctions, but may issue submissions to the NSDC on certain violations.

CCD allegations of Russian propaganda 

In July 2022 the Center for Countering Disinformation published a list of persons accused of promoting messages similar to Russian propaganda. Journalist Glenn Greenwald, included in the list, called it "McCarthyite idiocy" and several other persons from the list rejected the accusation. Quincy Institute for Responsible Statecraft criticized the list as a misstep from democratic values such as freedom of speech, an apparent attempt to discredit and silence political scientist John Mearsheimer and other U.S. and Western analysts whose views differ from the Ukrainian government. The list of Russian propagandists was removed from the website of the Center for Countering Disinformation, but its copy is saved in the Internet Archive.

On October 3 2022, an updated list appeared on the Center's website. It was available only in Ukrainian while sourcing non-Ukrainian sources, incorrectly assigned nationalities to members of the list, and has since been deleted.

Notes

References 
 Official website of The Center for Countering Disinformation

Government agencies of Ukraine
Government agencies established in 2021
2021 establishments in Ukraine
National Security and Defense Council of Ukraine
Disinformation
Information management